The Cuba men's national tennis team represents Cuba in Davis Cup tennis competition and are governed by the Federación Cubana de Tenis de Campo.

Cuba currently competes in the Americas Zone Group III.  They played in the World Group in 1993.

History
Cuba competed in its first Davis Cup in 1924.

Current team (2022) 

 Osviel Turino
 Osmel Rivera Granja
 Yoan Pérez
 Dayron Zúñiga

See also
Davis Cup
Cuba Fed Cup team

External links

Davis Cup teams
Davis Cup
Davis Cup